Trevor Butler is a TV personality, best known for being a contestant and winner of Big Brother Australia Series 4 (airing in 2004). As well as being the first, and currently the only, contestant to win the million prize money, as opposed to previous seasons, when the prize money was previously $250,000, and is also the highest prize money awarded in Australia game show history, and making Butler, one of the highest paid TV personalities.

Butler also boosted interest in the final eviction night by proposing to his then-girlfriend Breea Forrest live on the eviction stage.

There was some controversy regarding how much of his winnings could be claimed as tax. At one point the Australian Taxation Office (ATO) considered it to be payment for spending the time in the house, and therefore wanted to take nearly half of the winnings away. The ATO eventually gave in and did not take the money.

Butler returned as a contestant for Big Brother 14 alongside other previous contestants.

Biography

Butler was one of seven celebrities to feature in a television program named Celebrity Overhaul. The program aired in February and March 2005. All five episodes won the highest audience numbers for the Sunday 6:30 p.m. timeslot. Butler lost 15 kg.

Butler appeared in episode 6 of Summer Heights High as a special guest on "Polynesian Cultural Appreciation Day".

Butler currently works for the Gold Coast Radio Station 102.9 Hot Tomato.

Butler and his wife Breea, live in Tweed Heads in far north New South Wales. On 11 October 2007, Breea gave birth to their first child, a boy named Maika Jeremy Butler. On 31 December 2010, Breea gave birth to their second son Creedance Heath Butler.

Known as Big Trev he works on the drive home show alongside Moyra Major on Hot Tomato.

In 2022, Trevor returned for Big Brother 14 as one of eight returning housemates. Butler was one of three former winners to enter the house, alongside Big Brother 3 winner Regina Bird and Big Brother 10 winner Tim Dorner. He was the sixth housemate to be evicted, finishing in 16th place.

References

 

Australian people of Fijian descent
Big Brother (Australian TV series) contestants
Big Brother (franchise) winners
Year of birth missing (living people)
Living people
People from Tweed Heads, New South Wales